(born January 21) is a manga artist. Shiho Sugiura debuted in 1994 and works under the BL publisher . Sugiura's newest manga series, Shuuten Unknown, is serializing in Monthly Comic Avarus.

Work 
Sugiura's manga, such as Koori no Mamono no Monogatari (Legend of the Ice Demon), and Silver Diamond (2003-2011) are considered part of the shonen ai genre. Silver Diamond was considered to be a fun story with art that is "distinctively 1990s," according to Anime News Network. The first few volumes were translated into English and published by Tokyopop.

When Shuuten Unknown was released, bookstores in Tokyo and other cities held an exhibition of Sugiura's work. Shuuten Unknown is a fantasy manga about two different organizations searching for treasure.

Bibliography

References

External links
  

Manga artists
Living people
Japanese women writers
Japanese women artists
Year of birth missing (living people)